Antonia Moreno Leyva (1848-1916) was the first lady of Peru in 1886-1890 by her marriage to president Andrés Avelino Cáceres.

Prior to being president, her spouse participated in the War of the Pacific 1879-1883. She accompanied him on the Breña campaign 1881. During the absence of her spouse, she actively participated in warfare and commanded battalions.  She is the only woman to be buried in Cripta de los Héroes del Cementerio Presbítero Maestro, a cemetery for war heroes, after a special permission made it possible.

References

1848 births
1916 deaths
First Ladies of Peru
19th-century Peruvian people
Women in 19th-century warfare
Women in war in South America